Minuscule 493 (in the Gregory-Aland numbering), ε 501 (in the Soden numbering), is a Greek minuscule manuscript of the New Testament, on paper. Palaeographically it has been assigned to the 15th century. 
Scrivener labeled it by number 578.
The manuscript is lacunose.

Description 

The codex contains the text of the four Gospels on 157 paper leaves (size ) with some lacunae (Matthew 4:13-11:27; Mark 1:1-6:1). The missing texts were added by a later hand. The text is written in one column per page, 27 lines per page. According to F. H. A. Scrivener it is ill written.

It text was divided according to the Ammonian Sections by a later hand. Lectionary markings at the margin were added by a later hand. There are also some marginal notes added by a later hand.

Text 

The Greek text of the codex is a representative of the Byzantine text-type. Aland placed it in Category V.
Hermann von Soden included it to the textual family Kx. It was confirmed by the Claremont Profile Method.

History 

The manuscript once belonged to the Samuel Butler's collection (as 491 and 492). 

The manuscript was added to the list of New Testament manuscripts by Scrivener (578) and Gregory (493). It was examined by Scrivener and Bloomfield. Gregory saw it in 1883.

It is currently housed at the British Library (Add MS 11839) in London.

See also 

 List of New Testament minuscules
 Biblical manuscript
 Textual criticism

References

Further reading 

 

Greek New Testament minuscules
15th-century biblical manuscripts
British Library additional manuscripts